Frank Foster (25 April 1940 – 20 December 2019) born in Maryport was an English professional rugby league footballer who played in the 1960s and 1970s, and coached in the 1970s and 1980s.

Playing career

International honours
Frank Foster won a cap for Great Britain while at Hull Kingston Rovers in 1967, against Australia.

County honours
Frank Foster represented Cumberland on 8 occasions.

County Cup Final appearances
Frank Foster played right- in Hull Kingston Rovers' 25–12 victory over Featherstone Rovers in the 1966 Yorkshire Cup Final  at Headingley, Leeds on Saturday 15 October 1966, and played as an interchange replacing  John Hickson) in the 8–7 victory over Hull F.C. in the 1967 Yorkshire Cup Final at Headingley on Saturday 14 October 1967.

Coaching career
1973 saw Barrow appoint their former player, Foster as coach. He built a side which won the Second Division championship in 1975/76, and reached a John Player Trophy Final in 1981, only to lose 5–12 to Warrington. Phil Hogan was transferred to Hull Kingston Rovers in 1978 for a then world record fee of £33,000. Barrow fluctuated between divisions and Foster was eventually replaced by Tommy Dawes in April 1983.  The same year Foster was appointed coach at Whitehaven where he remained in charge until the summer of 1985.

References

External links
Frank Foster at eraofthebiff.com
History of Barrow Rugby
Statistics at orl-heritagetrust.org.uk 
Photograph 'Glen Beaumont Signing' at rlhp.co.uk
(archived by web.archive.org) Back on the Wembley trail
 (archived by web.archive.org) Hull Kingston Rovers ~ Captains

1940 births
2019 deaths
Barrow Raiders coaches
Barrow Raiders players
Bradford Bulls players
Cumberland rugby league team players
English rugby league coaches
English rugby league players
Great Britain national rugby league team players
Hull Kingston Rovers players
Oldham R.L.F.C. players
Rugby league locks
Rugby league players from Maryport
Whitehaven R.L.F.C. coaches
Workington Town players